Mitchell Technical College (Mitchell Tech) is a public technical school with its main campus in Mitchell, South Dakota. Mitchell Tech was founded in 1968. It offers 35 associate degree programs and 15 certificate programs. Since 1980, Mitchell Tech has been accredited by the Higher Learning Commission.

In October 2014, the school received a $1 million donation, the largest sum ever granted to any technical school in South Dakota.

References

External links
 Official website
 

Technological universities in the United States
Community colleges in South Dakota
Schools in Davison County, South Dakota
1968 establishments in South Dakota
Educational institutions established in 1968
Two-year colleges in the United States